Ruth Towse FRSA is a British economist and Professor of Economics of Creative Industries at Bournemouth University and Professor Emerita at Erasmus University, Rotterdam. A leading authority in cultural economics with a particular emphasis on the economics of media and copyright, she has taught in UK, the Netherlands, Italy and Thailand universities. She was married to Mark Blaug.

Education
Towse obtained a BA (Hons) in Political Economy from Reading University in 1964, then proceeding to obtain a MSc in Economics from the London School of Economics and Political Science in 1966. She gained a PhD in Economics from Erasmus University, Rotterdam in 2000.

Career
She was Joint Editor of the Journal of Cultural Economics from 1993 to 2002. She has served as the President of the Association for Cultural Economics International from 2006 to 2008. She is a fellow of the Royal Society of Arts.

Selected publications

Books

Edited books

Authored books

Journal articles

References

1943 births
British economists
British women economists
Cultural economists
Alumni of the University of Reading
Erasmus University Rotterdam alumni
Alumni of the London School of Economics
Living people